"Girls on Top" is a song by British-Dutch girl group Girl Thing. It was released on 30 October 2000 in Australia, and on 6 November 2000 in the UK as the second single from their self-titled debut studio album (2001). Despite previous single "Last One Standing" peaking at number eight on the UK Singles Chart, "Girls on Top" only charted at number 25, resulting in the group being dropped by their record label and their album not being released in the UK.

Charts

References

2000 singles
2000 songs
Girl Thing songs
Songs written by Andy Watkins
Songs written by Paul Wilson (songwriter)
Songs written by Tracy Ackerman
RCA Records singles
Song recordings produced by Absolute (production team)